The 2017 Clemson Tigers men's soccer team represents Clemson University during the 2017 NCAA Division I men's soccer season.  The Tigers were led by head coach Mike Noonan, in his eighth season.  They play home games at Riggs Field.  This was the team's 57th season playing organized men's college soccer and their 30th playing in the Atlantic Coast Conference.  The Tigers finished with a record of 12–6–1 and an ACC record of 4–4–0.  The Tigers lost in the Semifinals of the ACC tournament to eventual champions Wake Forest.  They were selected to participate in the NCAA Tournament for the fifth year in a row.  However, they lost to Coastal Carolina in the second round.

Roster

Updated September 5, 2017

Prior to the season, Tanner Dieterich and Oliver Shannon were named co-captains of the team.

Coaching staff

Source:

Schedule

Source:

|-
!colspan=8 style=""| Exhibition

|-
!colspan=7 style=""| Regular season

|-
!colspan=6 style=""| ACC Tournament

|-
!colspan=6 style=""| NCAA Tournament

Goals Record

Disciplinary Record

Awards and honors

Draft picks

The Tigers had two players drafted in the 2018 MLS SuperDraft.

Rankings

References

Clemson
Clemson Tigers men's soccer seasons
Clemson
2017 in sports in South Carolina
Clemson